Sir De Villiers Graaff, 4th Baronet, is a South African businessman and owner of De Grendel Wine Estate.  He is a noted restaurateur and vintner having won 24 awards for wines produced on the De Grendel estate. The eldest son of Sir David Graaff, 3rd Baronet becoming the 4th Graaff Baronet on 24 January 2015. Graaff obtained his undergraduate degree in agriculture at University of Stellenbosch in 1993.

References

Baronets in the Baronetage of the United Kingdom
Viticulturists
1970 births
People from the Western Cape
de Villiers
Stellenbosch University alumni
People from Cape Town
Living people